Dunning Creek is a  tributary of the Raystown Branch Juniata River in south west/south central Pennsylvania in the United States.

Dunning Creek joins the Raystown Branch just downstream of Bedford.

Bridges
 The Snooks Covered Bridge crosses Dunning Creek in East St. Clair Township.
 The New Paris Covered Bridge crosses Dunning Creek at Napier Township.
 The Dr. Knisley Covered Bridge crosses Dunning Creek at West St. Clair Township.

See also
List of rivers of Pennsylvania

References

External links
U.S. Geological Survey: PA stream gaging stations

Rivers of Pennsylvania
Tributaries of the Juniata River
Rivers of Bedford County, Pennsylvania